Lockdown is a professional wrestling event held by the American professional wrestling promotion Impact Wrestling. The event was first held in 2005 and was considered one of the flagship events in the company (alongside Slammiversary and Bound for Glory).
The event's premise was that the entire card would be contested inside a steel cage. Other matches on the card featured additional gimmicks added on to the steel cage format, such as the signature Lethal Lockdown match (a variant on the WarGames match), and the Xscape and "Queen of the Cage" matches.

Originally, Lockdown was to have only two cage matches to highlight the name; the 2013 event was the only one to follow this format. With the exception of the 2005 and 2006 events, Lockdown has been held outside the Impact Zone in Orlando, Florida. The first ten events were held on Pay-per-view, while the last two events were broadcast as special episodes of Impact's weekly television series. On January 24, 2020, Impact announced the return of Lockdown as an Impact Plus special, to be held on March 28, 2020, but the event was cancelled due to the COVID-19 pandemic.

Events

Featured matches
Over the years, Lockdown has become a featured PPV in Impact Wrestling's monthly schedule, several gimmick matches have become recurring highlights of the show. These matches are intended to provide a different "flavor" to the show as opposed to a simple eight cage match card.

Lethal Lockdown
The first match ever announced for a Lockdown pay per view was the Lethal Lockdown, a variant of the WarGames match popularized in World Championship Wrestling. The match features a multi-man competition in which opponents from each team enter in alternating fashion. Victory can only be gained after everyone has entered the cage. The match has evolved over the years, developing from a three-on-three match (2005) to a four-on-four (2006, 2009, 2010-2011 and 2014) to a five-on-five (2007-2008, 2012-2013). Since 2006, the match also includes a roof to the cage, making it the only match with such a feature in TNA, until TNA introduced The Asylum.

Xscape Match
The second annually featured match on a Lockdown PPV was the Xscape match. Consisting of a multi-stage, multi-wrestler competition, the rules involve wrestlers eliminating each other by pinfall or submission. Once the competition is down to two wrestlers, the two remaining competitors attempt to escape the cage by climbing out over the top or through the door. The second stage of this match is based on the concept of the Blassie cage match.

Queen of the Cage
Introduced in 2008, the Queen of the Cage match has been held at 2 Lockdown PPV's, and it features the TNA Knockouts. The match when it debuted began as similar to a reverse-battle royal involving eight wrestlers. The first two wrestlers that entered the cage then competed in a one-on-one match that was won via pin fall or submission. The winner became the number one contender for the TNA Women's Knockout Championship. In 2009, the match was a four-way. Since then, the match have not been added in the pay-per-view anymore.

References